Kapil Hoble (born 19 May 1998) is an Indian professional footballer who plays as a midfielder for Churchill Brothers in the I-League.

Career 
Hoble played for the under-18 team of Dempo in the 2014–15 edition of the Youth League. A midfielder, he was also employed as a forward the following season. He was later drafted to the senior side and played in the 2015–16 edition of the I-League 2nd Division. He represented home state Goa in the 2017–18 edition of Santosh Trophy.

Hoble moved to FC Goa in 2018 and represented their Reserves side in the I-League 2nd Division and Goa Professional League for a couple of seasons.

Churchill Brothers 
Hoble was signed by Churchill Brothers ahead of the 2021–22 season of the I-League.

Career statistics

References

External links 
 Kapil Hoble at the AIFF

1998 births
Living people
Indian footballers
Footballers from Goa
Association football midfielders
I-League players
Goa Professional League players
Churchill Brothers FC Goa players